is a former Japanese football player.

Club statistics

References

External links

1985 births
Living people
Tokoha University alumni
Association football people from Tokyo
Japanese footballers
J1 League players
J2 League players
Hokkaido Consadole Sapporo players
Thespakusatsu Gunma players
Association football defenders
People from Ōme, Tokyo